The 1965 NCAA University Division Swimming and Diving Championships were contested in March 1965 at the Beyer Hall Pool at Iowa State University in Ames, Iowa at the 42nd annual NCAA-sanctioned swim meet to determine the team and individual national champions of University Division men's collegiate swimming and diving in the United States.

USC finished in first place in the team standings for the third consecutive year, edging out Indiana by six-and-a-half points. This was the Trojans' fourth title in program history (and fourth title in five years).

Team standings
Note: Top 10 only
(H) = Hosts
Full results

See also
List of college swimming and diving teams

References

NCAA Division I Men's Swimming and Diving Championships
NCAA University Division Swimming And Diving Championships
NCAA University Division Swimming And Diving Championships
NCAA University Division Swimming And Diving Championships